Sebastian Becker (born 10 April 1985) is a German former footballer who played as a midfielder.

Career
Becker made his professional debut for Eintracht Trier in the 2. Bundesliga on 12 March 2004, coming on as a substitute in the 85th minute for Matthias Keller in the 4–0 home win against Jahn Regensburg.

References

External links
 Profile at DFB.de
 Profile at kicker.de

1985 births
Living people
Sportspeople from Trier
Footballers from Rhineland-Palatinate
German footballers
Association football midfielders
SV Eintracht Trier 05 players
FC Augsburg players
FC Augsburg II players
Kickers Offenbach players
FC Rot-Weiß Erfurt players
2. Bundesliga players
3. Liga players
Regionalliga players